Byers Peak, elevation , is a mountain in Grand County, Colorado southwest of Fraser, Colorado. The mountain is part of the Byers Peak Wilderness and is the peak for which the wilderness area is named. Byers Peak is easily seen from Fraser and serves as an easily-identifiable landmark.

The mountain is named for William Byers, the founder of the Rocky Mountain News.

References 

 

Mountains of Grand County, Colorado
North American 3000 m summits